The Bergen Light Rail is a light rail system serving Bergen, Norway. Stage two opened 21 June 2013 and expanded the system with another five stations over 3.6 kilometres to Lagunen. Stage three opened in 2016.

The stations and the visual profile of the system as a whole are designed by the Bergen-based design groups Cubus and Fuggi Baggi Design, and Copenhagen-based Kontrapunkt. The stations of the first two stages will be situated on street level, and will have facilities for buying tickets and dynamic displays that show when the next tram will arrive. The platforms will have step-free access to the trams, accessible by wheelchairs and perambulators. While the trams will initially be 32 metre long and have five articulated sections, the stations are dimensioned for 44 metre long trains with seven articulated sections should higher capacity be necessary.

The municipality government of Bergen has permitted denser development around the stations, where it wants most new housing in Bergen to be built. Development projects for Slettebakken, Wergeland, Paradis and Lagunen have been announced by private developers. Many of the stations are located in primarily residential areas, and the projects have met a lot of resistance from residents who fear that the character of their neighbourhoods will be radically altered.

Stations
The following is a list of the Bybanen light rail stations.

References

Stations